Hélène Grenier was a Canadian librarian born in 1900 who died in 1992.

Biography
She was director of school libraries for the Catholic School Commission of Montreal from 1933 to 1961. A musician, she published in 1947 a monograph entitled The Symphonic Music of Monteverde to Beethoven. She was the granddaughter of former Quebec premier Félix-Gabriel Marchand.

Grenier's archives are kept in the Montreal archives center of the Bibliothèque et Archives nationales du Québec.

References

1900 births
1992 deaths
Canadian librarians
Canadian women librarians
Place of birth missing
Place of death missing